"Maybe It's Great" is a song by Australian singer-songwriter Natalie Imbruglia, released on 16 July 2021 as the promotional single from her sixth studio album, Firebird.

Discussing the track upon release, Imbruglia said: "It was a dream come true to work with Albert Hammond Jr. We had such a great time recording in Byron Bay and this track gives me all the VHS 80s vibes. His energetic guitar was the cherry on top! He didn't disappoint."

Reception
Jon Stickler from Stereo Board described the song as an "'80s-inspired synth-pop anchored by a driving beat". Culture Fix called it "a rousing pop anthem that truly asserts the singer's welcome return to the world of pop music."

Digital Single
International
 "Maybe It's Great" - 3:54

References

2021 singles
Natalie Imbruglia songs
Songs written by Natalie Imbruglia
Songs written by Albert Hammond Jr.
2021 songs